Mylon Watkins is a former boxer in the Junior middleweight division.

Career

Amateur career
Known as "Kid USA", Watkins had an outstanding amateur career, and was the upset winner of the 1984 National Golden Gloves Welterweight Championship  and the 1985 and 1986 National Golden Gloves Light middleweight Champion.

Professional career
Watkins turned pro in 1987 and won his first two pro bouts, but never fought as a professional again.  Watkins was shot in the chest  during an argument, but not fatally, and never returned to the ring due to his injuries.

References

External links
 

Living people
African-American boxers
Middleweight boxers
National Golden Gloves champions
Boxers from Washington (state)
American male boxers
Year of birth missing (living people)
21st-century African-American people